Argel can refer to:
 Solenostemma argel, a plant
 Spanish and Portuguese name of Algiers, or in English texts translated from Spanish or Portuguese
Argel, a village in Moldovița Commune, Suceava County, Romania
Argel (river), a tributary of the Moldovița in Suceava County, Romania
Argel, Armenia
Argel Fuchs (born 1974), a Brazilian football (soccer) player, played for Brazil